Leedstown is a village on the B3280 road between Helston and Hayle in the civil parish of Crowan (where the 2011 census population is included.), Cornwall, England. It is located halfway between the north and south coasts.

Leedstown got its name from the Duke of Leeds, who married the daughter of the St Aubyn family. The village has a primary school,a pub and a garage.

The first school, described as ″a large boys school″ was funded by John St Aubyn in, or around 1813 and a girls school was built in the 1840s. A board school was opened June 1879. Designed by Mr W Carah of Crowan the school had two large classrooms. Today, the school is now known as Leedstown Community Primary School and is part of Kernow Learning Multi Academy Trust.

Remains of the former Crenver and Wheal Abraham mines may be seen along the road to Crenver Grove. The former Godolphin Mine is in the woods near Godolphin Hall; copper was mined here before the 17th century. Leedstown is situated in the Cornwall and West Devon Mining Landscape which was designated as a World Heritage Site in 2006.

The current Methodist Chapel was built in 1864. The existing pipe organ was installed in 1899 and a school room was added in 1907. Stained glass windows commemorate the fallen of the First world War {St George and dragon cost £91} whilst round patterned windows remember the second War. Pictorial windows of Jesus the good shepherd and Dorcus were given by American emigre family in 1954. In 1923 the chapel was refurbished and electricity and a heating system were installed at a cost of £850.

References

Villages in Cornwall